Scopellaria is a genus of flowering plants belonging to the family Cucurbitaceae.

Its native range is Southern Central China to Western and Central Malesia.

Species:

Scopellaria diversifolia 
Scopellaria marginata

References

Cucurbitaceae
Cucurbitaceae genera